Mianwali railway station is located in Mianwali, Pakistan.

See also
 List of railway stations in Pakistan
 Pakistan Railways

References

Railway stations in Mianwali District
Railway stations on Kotri–Attock Railway Line (ML 2)